The High Fichtel Mountains, or High Fichtel, form a mountainous and heavily forested range consisting of several mountain chains in the shape of a horseshoe, the Fichtel Mountain Horseshoe (Fichtelgebirgs-Hufeisen), that rings the Selb-Wunsiedel Plateau.

As a natural region the High Fichtel Mountains are major unit 394 within the major unit group of the Thuringian-Franconian Highlands (39), that run from the Thuringian Forest to the Fichtel Mountains. Since September 2010 there is a new system for classifying the natural regions of northeast Bavaria, whereby the natural region of the High Fichtel only covers the central mountain region of the Scheeberg, Ochsenkopf and Kösseine, whilst the Waldstein ridge, the Steinwald and lower parts of the horseshoe represent special subordinate natural regions of the Fichtel Mountains.

Geography 
The High Fichtel Mountains begin in the northeast at the  Kornberg, continue via the Waldstein, Schneeberg, Ochsenkopf and Königsheide in the southwest to the Kösseine, then over the Steinwald and Reichsforst to the Kohlwald in the southeast.

In the geomorphological division of the neighbouring Czech Republic, the Asch Hills, the Haslau Hills (Haslauer Hügelland or Hazlovská pahorkatina) and the Eger Hills (Egerer Hügelland or Chebská pahorkatina) are counted as part of the (High) Fichtel range.

Geology 
Geologically the mountain range consists mainly of granite. The history of its orogeny begins in the Pre-Cambrian about 750–800 million years ago – covering almost 20% of the earth's history, something which only applies to a few of the surviving ranges of the truncated Central Uplands of Germany today.

Mountains 
The mountains of the High Fichtel include the following, sorted by their elevation in metres (m) above sea level (NN):

Settlements 

 Bischofsgrün
 Brand (Oberpfalz)
 Erbendorf
 Ebnath
 Fichtelberg
 Goldkronach
 Konnersreuth
 Mehlmeisel
 Nagel
 Neusorg
 Schönbrunn
 Sparneck
 Tröstau
 Warmensteinach
 Weißdorf
 Zell im Fichtelgebirge

Lakes and rivers 
 See Fichtel Mountains article.

Transport 
 Marktredwitz railway hub
 B 303 and B 15 federal highways
 A 93 and A 9 motorways

References

Sources 
 Fritsch Wanderkarte 1:50.000 Fichtelgebirge-Steinwald,

External links 
BfN - landscape fact file
 Hohes Fichtelgebirge

Natural regions of Germany
Fichtel Mountains
Mountain ranges of Bavaria